Matthew Swanson is a Canadian filmmaker and commercial director from Vancouver, British Columbia. He is most noted for his 2005 short film Hiro, which was a Genie Award nominee for Best Live Action Short Drama at the 27th Genie Awards in 2007.

He is a graduate of the Mel Hoppenheim School of Cinema at Concordia University.

His other short films have included Tic Tac Toe (2007) and Seven Stars (2016).

References

External links

Living people
Film directors from Vancouver
Concordia University alumni
Year of birth missing (living people)